Nazea Hasan Sayed is an Indian actress and model who was born in Mumbai. She is best known for her work in daily soaps like Mahabharat, Dahleez and Lockdown Ki Love Story Ek Nayi Pehchan.

Career
She came into the limelight for her work in the series Aladdin (Kid Show), which was aired on Zee TV. She became popular for her work in Punar Vivah - Ek Nayi Umeed. She made her debut as an actress in the Bollywood movie Once Upon a Time in Mumbai Dobaara!, which was released in 2013. She also appeared in Mahabharat and Dahleez'' where she played the role of Vrushali and Simmi respectively. she played the role of Tanu Goel in Lockdown Ki Love Story which is produced by Rashmi Sharma telefims.presently working for &tv baalshiv as goddess Saraswati love with Rishabh

Filmography
 Aladdin as Princess Jasmine
 CID - Many episodics. 
 Punar Vivah - Ek Nayi Umeed as Sheela
 Ekk Nayi Pehchaan as Shanaya (Padmini Kolhapure Daughter)
 Mahabharat as Vrushali
 Dahleez as Simmi Ahuja
 Lockdown Ki Love Story as Tanu Goel
 Once Upon A Time In Mumbai Dobaara
 Ebn-e-Batuta as Bubbly 
 Devi Adi Parashakti as Mohini 
Anbe Vaa as Mohana Lakshminarayanan

References

External links
 

 Nazea Hasan Sayed on Instagram

Living people
Indian actresses
Actresses from Mumbai
Indian television actresses
Indian soap opera actresses
21st-century Indian actresses
1990 births